USS LST-875 was an  in the United States Navy. Like many of her class, she was not named and is properly referred to by her hull designation.

LST-875 was laid down on 18 October 1944 at Evansville, Indiana, by the Missouri Valley Bridge & Iron Co.; launched on 29 November 1944; sponsored by Mrs. Karl R. Zimmermann; and commissioned on 22 December 1944.

Service history
During World War II, LST-875 was assigned to the Asiatic-Pacific theater and participated in the assault and occupation of Okinawa Gunto in May and June 1945. Following the war, she performed occupation duty in the Far East until mid-September 1945. She was decommissioned on 22 April 1946 and struck from the Navy list on 19 July that same year. On 2 July 1948, the ship was transferred to the Philippine Navy where she served as RPS Misamis Oriental (LT-40).RPS Misamis Oriental Ferried soldiers of the Philippine Expeditionary Force to Korea during the Korean War.

LST-875 earned one battle star for World War II service.

References

 

LST-542-class tank landing ships
World War II amphibious warfare vessels of the United States
Ships built in Evansville, Indiana
1944 ships
Ships transferred from the United States Navy to the Philippine Navy
Korean War amphibious warfare vessels of the Philippines